Hubble Creek is a stream in Cape Girardeau County, Missouri in the United States. It is a tributary of the Castor River Diversion Channel.

The stream headwaters arise at  just east of Fruitland. The stream flows south passing under I-55 at the intersection with US Route 61.

Hubble Creek derives its name from Isthamar Hubble, a pioneer who settled at the creek in the late 1790s. Mr. Hubble was the proprietor of a mill on Hubble Creek.

See also
List of rivers of Missouri
Hubble Creek, Wayne County

References

Rivers of Cape Girardeau County, Missouri
Rivers of Missouri